Tony Currie may refer to:

 Tony Currie (broadcaster) (born 1951), Scottish broadcaster working for BBC Scotland
 Tony Currie (footballer) (born 1950), former England national team footballer
 Tony Currie (ice hockey) (born 1957), Canadian ice hockey player
 Tony Currie (rugby league) (born 1962), Australian rugby league footballer

See also
 Tony Curry (1937–2006), baseball player

fr:Tony Currie